Cape Reynolds is a rocky cape marking the south side of the terminus of David Glacier, on the coast of Victoria Land. Discovered by the British Antarctic Expedition, 1907–09, under Shackleton, who probably named this feature for Jeremiah (John) N. Reynolds, an American who long agitated for exploration of the Antarctic, and who was one of the principal promoters of the U.S. Exploring Expedition, 1838–42.
 

Headlands of Victoria Land
Scott Coast